Doron Solomons (Hebrew: דורון סולומונס; born 1969) is an Israeli video artist.

Biography 
Doron Solomons is a video artist born in London. In 1994-1991, he studied at the Art Teachers' Training College, Ramat Hasharon. He lives and works in Ramat Gan.

Art career
Since 2000, Solomon's artistic work has been influenced by his experience as a professional news editor, the materials to which he is exposed in this capacity, and the ethical problems posed.

Teaching 
 Kalisher School of Art, Tel Aviv
 Art Teachers' Training College, Ramat Hasharon

Awards and recognition
 1998 2004 The Minister of Education, Culture and Sport Prize, The Ministry of Education, Culture and Sport
 2006 The Hadassah and Rafael Klatchkin Prize, Artic 9, The Sharett Foundation, America Israel Cultural Foundation

Video art 
 The Long Arm of the Law (2002) 
 Inventory (2001) - Doron Solomons reviews his life with regard to the material inventory of all his belongings. Beginning with his wife to counting all the cassette tapes and things in his life, Solomons reflects on materialism on a whole and the proprietary relationship between an man and a woman.,
 Group Picture with a War (2005) – commissioned by the In Flanders Fields Museum to create a work from their collection of films dating back to World War I, Solomons unsurprisingly chose all the “behind-the-scenes” depictions, gaps, and intervals between battles: the men in the trenches, sleeping, treating the wounded.
 Tonight’s Headlines (2006) – in this work we find the newest version of the “eloquent silence” series running through Solomons’ oeuvre. The work starts out like an ordinary night edition of the news on Israeli Channel 2, but when the time comes for the anchors to announce the headlines, they stare at the camera, without uttering a word. They keep the gestures and body language characteristic of the media just as much as the spoken language itself.
 Shopping Day (2006), Solomons directly addresses the language of advertising and branding industries and its limited filmic lexicon. Using his editorial skill and editing language, he manages to subvert the message and create a drama of a daily and minor tragedy showing not only himself, but also this visual language, as pathetic.
 Good night (2008) - A father reads his son a bed time story but falls asleep. The sons covers, and in the end smothers, the father. The work refers to the reality of sons that bury their father and considers the local harsh reality of fathers burying their sons.

Articles 
 From Haifa to London and back Haaretz - Guide, October 22, 2010
 The Old Objectivity, Haaretz - Gallery, August 13, 2010

See also
Israeli art

References

External links 
 
 
 Doron Solomons at the Sommer Contemporary Art Gallery

Israeli video artists
Israeli artists
Living people
1969 births